"Even Better Than the Real Thing" is a song by Irish rock band U2, and is the second track on their seventh album, Achtung Baby (1992). It was released as the album's fourth single on 8 June 1992, and it reached number three in Ireland and Canada while becoming a top-ten hit in Austria, New Zealand, and Sweden. A remixed version of the song released the same year peaked at number eight in the United Kingdom and number 10 in Ireland. In 1997, readers of Mojo named the song the 71st-best track of the 1990s.

Writing and recording
"Even Better Than the Real Thing" originated from a chorus guitar riff that the Edge composed in Los Angeles during the Rattle and Hum sessions. A demo of the song, called "The Real Thing," was recorded at STS Studios during the same session in which "Desire" was recorded. The band remarked that the song's guitar riff reminded them of the Rolling Stones, but that it sounded "deeply traditional." Consequently, it was shelved until the Achtung Baby recording sessions, when the band took the multitrack recording of the demo to Hansa Studios in Berlin in late 1990. The band made little progress on the demo there, as the Berlin sessions were fraught with conflict and difficulty in completing songs.

The recording sessions, as well as the general mood, improved after the band returned to Dublin in 1991 to record at the "Elsinore" mansion on the Dalkey coastline. The song turned around after the Edge purchased a DigiTech Whammy pitch shifter pedal, which created a "double octave sweep" on the guitar riff. The band rediscovered their sense of fun and incorporated that into the writing of the song. Producer Brian Eno originally argued against the song's inclusion on the album when it contained the lyric "There ain't nothing like the real thing", claiming the song had to be "more ironic." After the lyric was revised to "Even better than the real thing," Eno changed his stance and supported the song's inclusion. Lead vocalist Bono explained the song's lyrics, as well as why the title was lengthened to "Even Better Than the Real Thing": "It was reflective of the times [the band] were living in, when people were no longer looking for the truth, [they] were all looking for instant gratification." Richard Branson requested to use the song in advertisements for his "Virgin Cola" to compete with Coca-Cola (who had been using the tagline "the real thing" for years), but the band declined.

When the covers to "Even Better Than the Real Thing", "The Fly," "Who's Gonna Ride Your Wild Horses," and "Mysterious Ways" are arranged, a picture of the band members driving a Trabant is formed.

Chart performance
The song peaked at number three in Ireland and number 12 in the United Kingdom, becoming one of the few U2 singles that failed to reach the top 10 in the UK Singles Chart. However, a few months after its initial release, English DJ Paul Oakenfold remixed the track; this version reached a new peak of number eight. Oakenfold later supported U2 on their PopMart Tour.

In the United States, the original version of the song reached number 32 on the Billboard Hot 100, number one on the Album Rock Tracks chart and number five on the Modern Rock Tracks chart, while the remix peaked at number 27 on the Hot Dance Music/Club Play chart and number 35 on the Hot Dance Music/Maxi-Singles Sales chart. In Canada it reached number three to become the third consecutive top-five hit from Achtung Baby. Elsewhere, the song reached the top 20 in Australia, Austria, Finland, the Netherlands, New Zealand, Sweden and Switzerland.

Critical reception
While reviewing the remix of the song, Paul Mathur from Melody Maker wrote that, "remodelled by Paul Oakenfold, it's the best thing they've done for a while". Roger Morton from New Musical Express explained, "The 'Perfect Mix' is a kind of compromise where for a splendid 60 seconds you don't know it's a U2 record, thanks to the stomp rhythm and clap beats. Then Bono's spliced vocals are released ans you end up with a half way House part peaking piano euphoria and "take me higher" gospel choirs, and part arcing guitars and chest-beating. It makes for an aqequately propulsive scream up, but then so do the 'Trance Mix' and 'Sexy Dub' mixes where U2 are largely noticeable by their absence. It's more than a novelty but less than a stroke of genius, with a whiff of old rock'n'roller condescension about it, and the nightmare spectre of Bono dancing his way back to God, hanging in the air."

Music video
The accompanying music video for "Even Better Than the Real Thing" was directed by Kevin Godley, formerly of 10cc and Godley & Creme, and was produced by Iain Brown. It was shot at two locations: the former Zoo clothes shop located at 32–34 Carnaby Street in London on 11 February 1992, then Pinewood Studios in Buckinghamshire from 12–14 February 1992. The video featured the band and their own lookalike group The Doppelgangers, which was formed by U2 and Godley specifically for the video. U2 and The Doppelgangers swap places several times throughout the video that was also edited with various clips of television footage. The video won two awards at the 1992 MTV Video Music Awards, for Best Group Video and Best Visual Effects; it was shot with a 360-degree camera rollover rig, designed and built by Simon Tayler of Artem in London specifically for the video. The video also uses a snippet of Sega's arcade version of the video game G-LOC: Air Battle.

Live performances
The song was performed at every date of the band's Zoo TV and PopMart Tours, and was played sporadically on the Elevation Tour. The "Fish Out of Water" remix, later released in the 20th anniversary edition of Achtung Baby, was played as the opening song during the 2011 legs of the U2 360° Tour. This remix would return for performances during the Innocence + Experience Tour.

After missing the entirety of the Joshua Tree Tour 2017 and the first leg of the Experience + Innocence Tour, the song returned to the setlist for the European leg of the Experience + Innocence Tour. The "Fish Out of Water" remix was again used, albeit without the slide guitar intro and less backing tracks. The song would return for the Joshua Tree Tour 2019, performed in the same style as the Experience + Innocence Tour.

Track listings

Personnel
Bono – vocals
The Edge – guitar, backing vocals
Adam Clayton – bass guitar
Larry Mullen Jr. – drums
Production – Steve Lillywhite with Brian Eno and Daniel Lanois
Engineering – Paul Barrett and Robbie Adams
Mixing – Steve Lillywhite and Robbie Adams
Mixing assistance – Sean Leonard

Charts

Weekly charts
Original version

Remix version

Year-end charts

Covers
In his Jacques Lu Cont guise, Stuart Price reworked the song for the 2011 tribute album AHK-toong BAY-bi Covered. "The original multitracks gave me an insight into how U2 worked," he remarked, "but I couldn't be too precious about the track."

Pop band Dead or Alive covered the track for the 1998 tribute album, We Will Follow: A Tribute to U2. An edited version also featured on their album 'Fragile', released in 2000.

See also
List of covers of U2 songs - Even Better Than the Real Thing
List of number-one mainstream rock hits of 1992 (United States)

References

External links
 Lyrics and list of performances at U2.com
 Amazing Camera Rig Effect by ARTEM

1992 singles
U2 songs
Island Records singles
Music videos directed by Kevin Godley
Song recordings produced by Brian Eno
Songs written by Bono
Songs written by the Edge
Songs written by Adam Clayton
Songs written by Larry Mullen Jr.
Song recordings produced by Daniel Lanois
Song recordings produced by Steve Lillywhite
1991 songs
Psychedelic pop songs